Yli-Suolijärvi is a medium-sized lake in the Kemijoki main catchment area. It is located in Posio municipality, in the region of Lapland in northern Finland.

See also
List of lakes in Finland

References

Lakes of Posio